Bennane is a town in Monastir Governorate, Tunisia.

See also
List of cities in Tunisia

References

Populated places in Monastir Governorate